Dhys Faleafaga (born 17 October 2000) is a New Zealand rugby union and sevens player. She plays for Chiefs Manawa in the Super Rugby Aupiki competition and for Wellington provincially. She has played for the Black Ferns and the Black Ferns Sevens internationally.

Personal life 
Faleafaga attended St Mary's College and played for their First XV. They won the National First XV and Sevens titles in 2016 and 2017. Her mother, Vanessa was a flanker who represented Samoa at the 2002 and 2006 Women's Rugby World Cups. She also played netball for the Central Pulse. Her older sister, Lyric Faleafaga, was previously a member of the Black Ferns Sevens squad.

Rugby career

2017–2018 
Faleafaga made her debut for the Wellington Pride in 2017. In 2018, she was one of 28 female rugby players to be the first-ever 15s players to be offered Black Ferns contracts by New Zealand Rugby.

2019 
Faleafaga was contracted by the Black Ferns Sevens squad as an injury replacement in 2019. She made her rugby sevens debut for New Zealand at the 2019 Japan Women's Sevens in Kitakyushu.

2021–2023 
In 2021, She was named in the Black Ferns squad for the end of year tour of England and France. She later made her Black Ferns debut against England on 31 October 2021 in Exeter.

The Hurricanes named her in their squad for the historic Super Rugby Aupiki competition. She signed with Chiefs Manawa for the competitions second season.

References

External links 

 Black Ferns Profile

Living people
New Zealand women's international rugby union players
New Zealand female rugby union players
New Zealand female rugby sevens players
New Zealand women's international rugby sevens players
2000 births